Brian Raubenheimer (19 July 1940 – 21 June 2021) was a South African racing driver from Pietermaritzburg. He attempted to make his Formula One debut in 1965 South African Grand Prix but withdrew due to car not ready (engine not available).

Raubenheimer remained a car enthusiast and is considered the "father" of the Mini Marcos in South Africa.

Raubenheimer died on 21 June 2021, aged 80.

Complete Formula One World Championship results
(key)

Complete Formula One Non-Championship results
(key)

References

South African racing drivers
1940 births
Living people